Sergey Boyarsky (born 24 January 1980, Leningrad) is a Russian political figure, deputy of the 7th and 8th State Dumas convocations. 

Sergey Boyarsky was born in the family of the famous Russian actors Mikhail Boyarsky and Larisa Luppian, and he even played in several movies as a child. In 2002, he graduated from the Northwestern Management Institute, and in 2012 from the Russian Presidential Academy of National Economy and Public Administration. In 2011 he ran for the Legislative Assembly of Saint Petersburg of the 5th convocation. In 2012 he was appointed Advisor to the Governor of Saint Petersburg, Georgy Poltavchenko. From 2012 to 2016, he was also the head of the TV-channel Saint Petersburg. In December 2021, he headed the Saint Petersburg branch of the United Russia. 

In 2016 Sergey Boyarsky was elected deputy of the 7th State Duma. In 2021, he was re-elected for the 8th State Duma. Both times he ran from the United Russia.

On 24 March 2022, the United States Treasury sanctioned him in response to the 2022 Russian invasion of Ukraine.

References

1980 births
Living people
United Russia politicians
21st-century Russian politicians
Eighth convocation members of the State Duma (Russian Federation)
Russian individuals subject to the U.S. Department of the Treasury sanctions
Northwestern Management Institute alumni